Kevin Abbring (born 20 January 1989) is a Dutch rally racing driver. His father, Edwin Abbring, is also a well-known former rally driver.

Career
Abbring started his motorsport career in Rallycross with a 60 bhp strong buggy for newcomers, winning the 2005 and 2006 titles of the Dutch Ford RST series. In 2007 he competed in the Dutch Rally Championship with a Mitsubishi Colt. He also made his World Rally Championship debut in a Mitsubishi Lancer Evolution IX. In 2008 he began competing in the Junior World Rally Championship in a Renault Clio R3, with backing from KNAF Talent First. He took his first JWRC win on the 2009 Rally Poland, on his way to fourth in the final standings for 2009. In 2010 he won the JWRC in Portugal. He has also competed in the Intercontinental Rally Challenge, winning the 2WD category in Ypres and Zlín. In October 2011 Abbring won the Driver of the Academy award for the inaugural FIA Institute Young Driver Excellence Academy.

After a successful trial rally for Volkswagen Motorsport driving a Škoda Fabia S2000 car at 2011 Wales Rally GB he signed with Volkswagen for the 2012 WRC season driving one of their Fabia's, sharing the second seat alongside Sebastien Ogier with Andreas Mikkelsen. Sadly, he was offered very few outings by VW in 2012 and didn't rally in the WRC at all in 2013.

In 2013 he won the French Peugeot 208 Rally Cup, leading to Peugeot Sport offering him a drive in the European Rally Championship in their new Peugeot 208 T16 R5 car.

Plagued with technical issues, Abbring took the lead in 5 ERC events, but was forced to retire with engine trouble on all event except Azores, (where he finished 2nd after falling back from the lead with mechanical issues) and the Tour de Corse, where he finished 3rd.

In January 2015, it was announced he would be the main testdriver for Hyundai Motorsport in the World Rally Championship. While his main focus would be the development of the new Hyundai i20 WRC, Abbring and Seb Marshall were also entered on selected WRC events later in the year.

He took his first stage win and first points at the 2016 13º Rally d'Italia Sardinia. He won his first international rally at the wheel of a Hyundai i20 R5 at the French Rallye du Var in 2016. In 2017, he was the first Dutchman ever to win the biggest rally of Belgium, the Ypres Rally, at the wheel of a Peugeot 208 R5.

Results

Complete FIA World Rallycross Championship results
(key)

Supercar/RX1

WRC results

WRC-2 results

JWRC results

ERC results

Overall rally victories

References

External links

 Official website 

Living people
1989 births
Dutch rally drivers
World Rally Championship drivers
World Rallycross Championship drivers
Intercontinental Rally Challenge drivers
FIA Institute Young Driver Excellence Academy drivers
European Rally Championship drivers
Peugeot Sport drivers
Saintéloc Racing drivers
Hyundai Motorsport drivers
Volkswagen Motorsport drivers